Damien Kelly is an Irish retired American soccer forward who played professionally in the United Soccer League, American Indoor Soccer Association and Southwest Independent Soccer League.

Youth
Kelly attended Eastern Illinois University where he was a 1980 and 1981 First Team and a 1983 Third Team All American soccer player.  He is a member of the Eastern Illinois Panthers Hall of Fame.

Professional
In 1983, the Tulsa Roughnecks selected him in the North American Soccer League draft and the Kansas City Comets selected him in the first round (fifth overall) in the Major Indoor Soccer League draft.  In 1984, he signed with the Dallas Sidekicks.  In 1985, he played for the Dallas Americans in the United Soccer League.  In September 1986, he signed with the Memphis Storm of the American Indoor Soccer Association.  In 1989, the team came under new ownership which renamed it the Memphis Rogues.  In 1990, the Rogues transferred to the Southwest Independent Soccer League and Kelly became a player-coach.

Kelly also played for the Ireland Olympic and Youth soccer teams.

References

External links
 NASL stats

1958 births
Living people
American Indoor Soccer Association players
Dallas Americans players
Dallas Sidekicks (original MISL) players
Eastern Illinois Panthers men's soccer players
Memphis Storm players
Republic of Ireland association footballers
Republic of Ireland expatriate association footballers
United Soccer League (1984–85) players
USISL coaches
USISL players
Association footballers from Dublin (city)
All-American men's college soccer players
Association football forwards
Republic of Ireland football managers